Route 225 is a provincial highway located in the Montérégie region of Quebec. The route starts at the Canada-United States border at the Alburgh–Noyan Border Crossing in Noyan and runs north along the eastern shores of the Richelieu River, ending in Sainte-Anne-de-Sabrevois at the junction of Route 133.

Municipalities along Route 225

 Noyan
 Henryville
 Sainte-Anne-de-Sabrevois

See also
 List of Quebec provincial highways

References

External links 
 Official Transports Quebec Road Network Map 
 Route 225 on Google Maps

225